
Year 449 BC was a year of the pre-Julian Roman calendar. At the time, it was known as the Third year of the decemviri and the Year of the Consulship of Potitus and Barbatus (or, less frequently, year 305 Ab urbe condita). The denomination 449 BC for this year has been used since the early medieval period, when the Anno Domini calendar era became the prevalent method in Europe for naming years.

Events 
 By place 
 Greece 
 The Greek city-states make peace with the Persian Empire through the Peace of Callias, named after Callias II, the chief Greek ambassador to the Persian Court, an Athenian who is a brother-in-law of Cimon. Athens agrees to end its support for the Egyptian rebels still holding out in parts of the Nile Delta, while the Persians agree not to send ships of war into the Aegean Sea. Athens now effectively controls all the Greek city states in Ionia.
 Pericles begins a great building plan including the re-fortification of Athens main port Piraeus and its long walls extending to Athens main city.
 Pericles proposes a "Congress Decree" allowing the use of 9,000 talents  to finance the massive rebuilding program of Athenian temples. This leads to a meeting ("Congress") of all Greek states in order to consider the question of rebuilding the temples destroyed by the Persians. The Congress fails because of Sparta's opposition.
 Pericles places the Athenian sculptor Phidias in charge of all the artistic aspects of his reconstruction program. Construction begins on the Temple of Hephaestus in Athens, while the Athenian Senate commissions Callicrates to construct a temple to Athena Nike on the Acropolis.
 The Second Sacred War erupts between Athens and Sparta, when Sparta forcefully detaches Delphi from Phocis and renders it independent.

 Rome 
 The Law of the Twelve Tables (developed by the Decemvirates) is formally promulgated in 450 B.C. The Twelve Tables are literally drawn up on twelve ivory tablets which are posted in the Forum Romanum so that all Romans can read and know them.
 When the Decemvirate's term of office expires, the decemviri refuse to leave office or permit successors to take office. Appius Claudius Crassus is said to have made an unjust decision which would have forced a young woman named Verginia into prostitution, prompting her father to kill her. This leads to an uprising against the Decemvirate forcing the decemviri to resign their offices. The ordinary magistrates (magistratus ordinarii) are re-instituted. Appius Claudius is said to have committed suicide as a result of these events.

 By topic 
 Literature 
 Herodotus completes his History, which records the events concerning the Persian War.

Births

Deaths 
 Appius Claudius Crassus, former decemvir (suicide)

References